Old River-Winfree is a city in Chambers and Liberty counties, Texas, United States. The population was 1,315 at the 2020 census.

Geography

Old River-Winfree is located in northwestern Chambers County at  (29.877309, –94.821571). A small portion extends north into Liberty County.

Demographics

As of the 2020 United States census, there were 1,315 people, 496 households, and 384 families residing in the city.

As of the census of 2000, there were 1,364 people, 475 households, and 397 families residing in the city. The population density was 1,086.5 people per square mile (418.0/km). There were 527 housing units at an average density of 419.8 per square mile (161.5/km). The racial makeup of the city was 92.60% White, 4.25% African American, 0.37% Native American, 0.07% Asian, 1.32% from other races, and 1.39% from two or more races. Hispanic or Latino of any race were 5.28% of the population.

There were 475 households, out of which 42.5% had children under the age of 18 living with them, 69.1% were married couples living together, 8.8% had a female householder with no husband present, and 16.4% were non-families. 14.3% of all households were made up of individuals, and 4.0% had someone living alone who was 65 years of age or older. The average household size was 2.87 and the average family size was 3.12.

In the city, the population was spread out, with 29.2% under the age of 18, 8.1% from 18 to 24, 30.4% from 25 to 44, 26.4% from 45 to 64, and 6.0% who were 65 years of age or older. The median age was 36 years. For every 100 females, there were 99.4 males. For every 100 females age 18 and over, there were 100.8 males.

The median income for a household in the city was $48,523, and the median income for a family was $52,857. Males had a median income of $43,182 versus $25,313 for females. The per capita income for the city was $19,114. About 4.9% of families and 6.9% of the population were below the poverty line, including 5.3% of those under age 18 and 11.5% of those age 65 or over.

Education
Old River-Winfree is served by Barbers Hill Independent School District.

Some areas north of Old-River Winfree are within Dayton Independent School District.

References

External links
City of Old River-Winfree official website

Cities in Texas
Cities in Chambers County, Texas
Greater Houston
Cities in Liberty County, Texas